Bubblegum is the sixth album by Clinic, released on 4 October 2010.

The album was produced by John Congleton and recorded at Elevator Studios in Liverpool. Lead single "I'm Aware" was released on 20 September 2010, with a second single, "Bubblegum", on 31 January 2011.

Track listing
 "I'm Aware" – 2:59
 "Bubblegum" – 2:53
 "Baby" – 3:59
 "Lion Tamer" – 3:00
 "Linda" – 2:44
 "Milk & Honey" – 3:13
 "The Radio Story" – 2:13
 "Forever (Demis' Blues)" – 3:11
 "Another Way of Giving" – 3:15
 "Evelyn" – 3:51
 "Un Astronauta En Cielo" – 2:15
 "Freemasons Waltz" – 3:27
 "Orangutan" – 3:00

References

2010 albums
Clinic (band) albums
Domino Recording Company albums
Albums recorded at Elevator Studios
Albums produced by John Congleton